'70s on 7 (or just The '70s) is a commercial-free, satellite radio channel on Sirius XM Radio channel 7 and Dish Network channel 6007 (channel 099-07 on Dish's Hopper DVR units). It plays pop, rock, soul, and disco music from the 1970s, mostly hits. Prior to XM’s merger with Sirius, Arbitron reported that '70s on 7 was the fourth most listened to channel, with a cume of 667,400 listeners per week. As part of the Sirius/XM merger on November 12, 2008, The '70s was merged with Sirius' Totally '70s and took its current name.

Much like the other decades channels, '70s on 7 attempts to recreate the feel of 1970s radio. It uses similar DJ techniques, jingles, 1970s slang, and news updates. Kid Kelly, formerly of WHTZ New York, programs the channel with Human Numan, a long-time contemporary hit radio personality. Creative imaging is produced by producer Mitch Todd who oversees all producers and production on the music channels and the marketing division. Due to being commercial-free, it does not recreate any sponsor spots. The channel was also used for XM's annual pop music chronology, IT.

The original XM "70s on 7" channel made a strong effort to reproduce the smooth, velvety 1970s FM sound rather than the chatty "morning drive" sound that Sirius favored.  After the XM-Sirius merger the "morning drive" sound became the "official" sound of the 1970s channel. The channel features the unique "Jukebox of Dynamite" (formerly the "Jukebox of Cheese"), when an alleged listener selects a "cheesy" song for the segment such as "Oh, Babe, What Would You Say?", "Seasons in the Sun", "Theme from Billy Jack", "Run Joey Run" or "Billy Don't Be A Hero".

70s on 7 also uses bumpers that parody TV shows and commercial jingles from the 70s, and also has its own parodies of movie scenes, known as "director's cuts".

The station's logo currently has a flower as the zero. Prior to 2015, the station's logo featured a disco ball as the zero. The internet version can be biased to play only disco and soul.

Core artists 
Stevie Wonder
Bachman-Turner Overdrive
KC & The Sunshine Band
Bee Gees
ABBA
Chicago
Earth, Wind & Fire
Elton John
Paul McCartney & Wings
Eagles
The Jackson 5
Marvin Gaye
Michael Jackson

References

External links
SiriusXM: '70s on 7

Sirius Satellite Radio channels
XM Satellite Radio channels
Sirius XM Radio channels
1970s-themed radio stations
Radio stations established in 2001